The 2012 Serbia Open (also known as Serbia Open 2012 powered by Telekom Srbija for sponsorship reasons) was a men's tennis tournament play on outdoor clay courts. The fourth edition of the event was hosted by Serbian player Novak Djokovic. It was part of the ATP World Tour 250 series of the 2012 ATP World Tour. It took place at the Tennis Center Novak complex in Belgrade, Serbia, from 28 April through 6 May 2012. Andreas Seppi won the singles title.

Singles main draw entrants

Seeds

 Seedings are based on the rankings of April 23, 2012

Other entrants
The following players received wildcards into the main draw:
  Marko Djokovic
  Evgeny Donskoy
  Dušan Lajović

The following players received entry from the qualifying draw:
  Aljaž Bedene
  Carlos Gómez-Herrera 
  Eduardo Schwank
  Antonio Veić

Withdrawals
  Novak Djokovic (personal reasons)

Retirements
  Dušan Lajović (ankle injury)

Doubles main draw entrants

Seeds

 Rankings are as of April 23, 2012

Other entrants
The following pairs received wildcards into the doubles main draw:
  Ilija Bozoljac /  Nikola Čačić
  Marko Djokovic /  Goran Tošić

Retirements
  David Nalbandian (fatigue)

Finals

Singles

 Andreas Seppi defeated  Benoît Paire, 6–3, 6–2
 It was Seppi's 1st title of the year and 2nd of his career.

Doubles

 Jonathan Erlich /  Andy Ram defeated  Martin Emmrich /  Andreas Siljeström, 4–6, 6–2, [10–6]

External links
Official website

Serbia Open
Serbia Open
2012 in Serbian sport
April 2012 sports events in Europe
May 2012 sports events in Europe